1959 Major League Baseball All-Star Game may refer to:

The 1959 Major League Baseball All-Star Game (first game), a 5–4 victory for the National League over the American League, played in Pittsburgh
The 1959 Major League Baseball All-Star Game (second game), a 5–3 victory for the American League over the National League, played in Los Angeles